The Parasimuliinae are a subfamily of Simuliidae (black flies) containing only one genus and four species. Most species are rare, and some are cave dwellers, in western North America.

Species
 Genus Parasimulium Malloch, 1914
 Subgenus Astoneomyia Peterson, 1977
 P. melanderi Stone, 1963
 Subgenus Parasimulium Malloch, 1914
 P. crosskeyi Peterson, 1977
 P. furcatum Malloch, 1914
 P. stonei Peterson, 1977

Literature cited

Simuliidae
Nematocera subfamilies
Monotypic Diptera taxa